Péter Szabó (13 April 1899 – 21 September 1963) was a Hungarian football manager and player.

Club career
Born in Budapest, Szabó played with MTK Budapest FC where he won three consecutive championships. In 1919 he moves abroad and joins Austrian side Wiener AF, but after making only one appearance in the 1919–20 Austrian football championship he, along his former MTK and national team teammate Alfréd Schaffer sign with German side 1. FC Nürnberg. Szabó played a total of 43 games for Nurnberg and won the 1920 German football championship. Next he played three seasons with Eintracht Frankfurt.  He also played with German sides FC Wacker München, Chemnitzer BC, Planitzer SC and Polish side Ruch Chorzów.

International career
Péter Szabó made 12 appearances for the Hungarian national team between 1916 and 1919.

Coaching career
Peter Szabó had a long coaching career that includes clubs from Turkey, Germany and Hungary.

Honours

MTK Budapest
Nemzeti Bajnokság I
Champion: 1916–17, 1917–18, 1918–19

1. FC Nürnberg
German Championship
 Champion: 1920
Southern German championship
 Champion: 1920
Kreisliga Nordbayern
Champion: 1920

Eintracht Frankfurt
 Kreisliga Nordmain
 Champion: 1920–21
 Runner-up: 1921–22

Chemnitzer BC
 Mitteldeutscher Pokal
 Winner: 1927

1. FC Köln
 Oberliga West
Runner-up: 1958–59

References

Sources

 Péter Szabó at eintracht-archiv.de

1899 births
1963 deaths
Hungarian footballers
Association football midfielders
MTK Budapest FC players
Nemzeti Bajnokság I players
Wiener AF players
Expatriate footballers in Austria
1. FC Nürnberg players
Eintracht Frankfurt players
FC Wacker München players
FSV Zwickau players
Expatriate footballers in Germany
Ruch Chorzów players
Expatriate footballers in Poland
Hungarian football managers
Expatriate football managers in Turkey
Expatriate football managers in Germany
Hungary international footballers
Galatasaray S.K. (football) managers
Eintracht Frankfurt managers
FSV Frankfurt managers
SSV Ulm 1846 managers
BKV Előre SE managers
Vasas SC managers
Dorogi FC managers
Szombathelyi Haladás football managers
1. FC Köln managers
Footballers from Budapest